South Africa sent a team to compete at the 2008 Summer Paralympics in Beijing, China and finished 6th on the medal table.

Natalie du Toit, five time gold medallist at the Athens Paralympics in 2004, competed in six swimming events. She also represented South Africa at the Beijing Olympics. Other members of the swim team included Charl Bouwer, Kevin Paul, Tadgh Slattery, Achmat Hassiem, Shireen Sapiro, Emily Gray, Sarah Shannon, Adri Visser and Beth Nothling. South Africa also sent a swimming official, Sharief Gamiet, to the games.

Oscar Pistorius represented South Africa in athletics.

South African representatives also competed in wheelchair basketball.

Medalists

The following South African athletes won medals at the games:

Sports

Athletics

Men's track

Men's field

Women's track

Women's field

Cycling

Men's road

Women's road

Men's track

Women's track

Equestrian

Individual events

Team

* Indicated the three best individual scores that count towards the team total.

Powerlifting

Women

Rowing

Swimming

Men

Women

Table Tennis

Men

Women

Wheelchair Basketball

Players
Justin Govender
Marcus Retief
David Curle
Grant Waites
Jeremiah Nel
Marius Papenfus
Nick Taylor
Ralph Taylor
Richard Nortje
Shaun Hartnick
Siphamandla Gumbi
Thandile Zonke
William Reichart

Tournament
Group A Matches

 

 

 

Classification 9-12

Ninth place

Wheelchair Tennis

Men

Women

See also
South Africa at the 2008 Summer Olympics
South Africa at the Paralympics

External links
Beijing 2008 Paralympic Games Official Site
International Paralympic Committee

References

Nations at the 2008 Summer Paralympics
2008
Paralympics